The Security of King and Government Act 1695 (7&8 Will.3 c.27) was an Act of the Parliament of England. Its long title was An act for the better security of his Majesty's royal person and government. It was passed in 1696 but backdated to the beginning of the parliamentary session.

It required all officers to take the oath required by the Oaths of Allegiance and Supremacy Act 1688 or be disenfranchised. It also said that anyone who said that William III was not the lawful king, or that James Francis Edward Stuart (the "Old Pretender") or his late father James II and VII had any title to the Crown, or that anyone else had such title other than according to relevant Acts of Parliament was guilty of praemunire. It was high treason to return to England from France without a licence after 1 May 1696.

See also
Jacobitism
Correspondence with Enemies Act 1691
Treason Act 1695
Treason Act

Notes

External links
Text of the Act

1695 in law
1695 in England
Treason in England
Acts of the Parliament of England
Oaths of allegiance